The Estadio Ruta de la Plata (literal English translation: Silver Road Stadium) is a stadium located in Zamora, Spain.  It was inaugurated on September 1, 2002, with a soccer game between Zamora CF and CD Ourense.

Property of the municipality, it is the home stadium of Zamora CF.  It is equipped with both an artificial grass and natural grass surface.  Its capacity is 7,813 spectators.

The stadium was constructed as a replacement for Zamora C.F.'s previous field, La Vaguada, was obsolete due to its age (15 years), its reduced capacity (approximately 4000) and the general mediocrity of the facilities.

A notable match held at the stadium was a European Under-21 qualification game between Spain and Armenia on April 1, 2003, which resulted in a 5-0 victory for Spain.

External links
Estadios de Espana

References

Football venues in Castile and León
Zamora CF
Sports venues in Castile and León
Buildings and structures in Zamora, Spain
Sports venues completed in 2002
Sport in Zamora, Spain